8 Letters is the debut full-length studio album by American boy band Why Don't We. The album was released on August 31, 2018, by Atlantic Records in the United States and by Warner Music Group elsewhere. The album was supported by three singles: "Hooked", "Talk" and the title-track "8 Letters".

Critical reception
Chris DeVille of Stereogum described the songs as "sometimes painfully adolescent in terms of subject matter", but praised the album's variety, songwriting, and production "that keeps them from feeling like a relic". Elias Leight of Rolling Stone gave the album a negative review, scoring it 1.5 out of 5 stars, criticizing the short length while stating the band "throws out eight new songs with little to show for it."

Singles
"Hooked" was released as the lead single from the album on June 7, 2018. The song peaked at number twenty-two on the US Bubbling Under Hot 100 Singles chart. "Talk" was released as the second single from the album on July 6, 2018. The song peaked at number eighteen on the US Bubbling Under Hot 100 Singles chart. "8 Letters" was released as the third single from the album on August 19, 2018. The song peaked at number fourteen on the US Bubbling Under Hot 100 Singles chart.

Chart performance
8 Letters was released on August 31, 2018, in the United States and debuted at number nine on the US Billboard 200 with first-week sales of 44,000 album  equivalent units of which 37,000 were pure album sales, dated September 15, 2018. The album entered the Canadian Albums Chart at number fifteen. The album debuted at number ten in Australia. On September 7, 2018, the album entered the UK Albums Chart at number twenty-five, before dropping out the chart the following week.

Track listing

Charts

Certifications

Release history

Notes

References

2018 debut albums
Atlantic Records albums
Warner Music Group albums
Albums produced by Cutfather
Albums produced by Steve Mac
Why Don't We albums